.cab may refer to:
 cabinet (file format) 
 a top-level domain for cab and taxi companies, see Generic top-level domain#New top-level domains